Thomas Carlton Bruner (born February 1, 1972) is an American former competition swimmer who specialized in long-distance freestyle events.

Background 
Bruner was born in Atlanta, Georgia in 1972, and he started his swimming career at the metropolitan Atlanta area Dynamo Swim Club.

Bruner accepted an athletic scholarship to attend the University of Florida in Gainesville, Florida, where he swam for the Florida Gators swimming and diving team in National Collegiate Athletic Association (NCAA) competition from 1991 to 1994.  While swimming for the Gators, Bruner was a two-time NCAA champion, including the 1,500-meter freestyle in 1992 and the 1,650-yard freestyle in 1993, and received five All-American honors.

Sport career 
Bruner was considered to be one of the ten best 800-meter and 1500-meter freestyle swimmers in the world from 1992 to 1996.  He placed third in both the 1993 and 1995 Pan Pacific Swimming Championships 1500-meter freestyle, and first in the 1995 Pan American Games, breaking the games record, in the same event.  Bruner represented the United States at the 1996 Summer Olympics in his hometown of Atlanta, where he placed thirteenth in the 1500-meter freestyle event.

Bruner is a veteran celebrity swimmer for Swim Across America (SAA), a charitable organization that raises funds for cancer research, and has participated in SAA events since 2005.

See also 

List of University of Florida alumni
List of University of Florida Olympians

References 

1972 births
Living people
American male freestyle swimmers
American male medley swimmers
Florida Gators men's swimmers
Olympic swimmers of the United States
Pan American Games gold medalists for the United States
Swimmers from Atlanta
Swimmers at the 1995 Pan American Games
Swimmers at the 1996 Summer Olympics
Pan American Games medalists in swimming
Dunwoody High School alumni
Medalists at the 1995 Pan American Games
20th-century American people
21st-century American people